Lempa may refer to:

Lempa, Cyprus (or Lemba), village near the Paphos District capital
San Francisco Lempa, municipality in El Salvador
Lempa River, Central American waterway

See also
Lemba (disambiguation)